Bantatay (International title: The Guardian) is a Philippine television drama comedy fantasy series broadcast by GMA Network. The series was inspired by the 1995 Film Fluke and 100 Deeds for Eddie McDowd. Directed by Don Michael Perez, it stars Raymart Santiago in the title role. It premiered on September 20, 2010 on the network's Telebabad line up replacing Langit sa Piling Mo. The series concluded on February 25, 2011 with a total of 115 episodes. It was replaced by Magic Palayok in its timeslot.

Cast and characters

Lead cast
 Raymart Santiago as Bernard Razon

Supporting cast
 Gelli de Belen as Marcella Razon
 Camille Prats as Daisy Razon
 Krystal Reyes as Emily Razon
 Renz Valerio as Junix Razon 
 Sweet Ramos as Farrah Razon
 Jennica Garcia as Joanna
 Carl Guevarra as Norbert
 Charlie Einstein of Rabanal as Bantatay
 Gary Estrada as Simon Gonzales
 Elmo Magalona as Arthur "Artie" Enriquez 
 Marissa Delgado as Clarita Enriquez
 Prince Stefan as Calvin Gonzales
 Eva Darren as Vangie Razon
 Kier Legaspi as Baldo
 Al Tantay as Rigor
 Sabrina Man as Princess
 Isabel Frial as Len Len

Guest cast
 Claudine Barreto as Shiela
 Sandy Andolong as Alma
 Nadine Samonte as Angel
 Christopher de Leon as Bart
 James Blanco as Dexter
 Benjie Paras as Jace
 Bernadette Allyson as Mrs. Gomez
 Lander Vera Perez as Mr. Gomez
 Joko Diaz as Kanor
 Rico Barrera as Ato
 Janna Dominguez as Cat 1
 Cara Eriguel as Cat 2
 Mel Kimura as Maria
 Rita Avila as Clarita
 Sylvia Sanchez as Corazon
 Carla Abellana as Krissa
 Jan Marini as Charlene

Voice cast
 Jaya
 John Lapus
 Rhian Ramos
 Michael V.
 Ruby Rodriguez
 Jillian Ward
 Gladys Guevarra
 Mura

Ratings
According to AGB Nielsen Philippines' Mega Manila People/Individual television ratings, the pilot episode of Bantatay earned a 12.5% rating. While the final episode scored an 8.8% rating.

References

External links
 

2010 Philippine television series debuts
2011 Philippine television series endings
Fantaserye and telefantasya
Filipino-language television shows
GMA Network drama series
Television shows set in the Philippines